Yury Grigoriyevich Grashchenkov (born 1945) is a career diplomat and the former ambassador of the Russian Federation to Benin.

Grashchenkov graduated from the Moscow State Institute of International Relations in 1974, and went on to work in various diplomatic posts in the central offices of the Ministry of Foreign Affairs and abroad.

From 1999 to 2002, he was the Russian Consul-General in Ho Chi Minh City, Vietnam. On 30 June 2008 Grashchenkov was appointed by Dmitry Medvedev to the post of Ambassador of Russia to Benin, with concurrent accreditation to Togo.

Grashchenkov speaks Russian, English, French and Khmer.

References 

Living people
Ambassadors of Russia to Benin
Ambassadors of Russia to Togo
Moscow State Institute of International Relations alumni
1945 births